The paramo robber frog (Pristimantis paramerus) is a species of frog in the family Strabomantidae.

It is endemic to Venezuela. Its natural habitat is tropical high-altitude grassland. It is threatened by habitat loss.

Sources

ARKive Images of Life on Earth: Paramo Robber Frog
Craugastoridae - Neotropical Frogs: It includes the Paramo Robber Frog
 Venezuela Endemic Amphibians Checklist: It includes the Paramo Robber Frog

Pristimantis
Endemic fauna of Venezuela
Amphibians of Venezuela
Amphibians of the Andes
Páramo fauna
Amphibians described in 1984
Taxonomy articles created by Polbot